In mathematics and computer science, Horner's method (or Horner's scheme) is an algorithm for polynomial evaluation. Although named after William George Horner, this method is much older, as it has been attributed to Joseph-Louis Lagrange by Horner himself, and can be traced back many hundreds of years to Chinese and Persian mathematicians. After the introduction of computers, this algorithm became fundamental for computing efficiently with polynomials.

The algorithm is based on Horner's rule, in which a polynomial is written in nested form: 

This allows the evaluation of a polynomial of degree  with only  multiplications and  additions. This is optimal, since there are polynomials of degree  that cannot be evaluated with fewer arithmetic operations.

Alternatively, Horner's method also refers to a method for approximating the roots of polynomials, described by Horner in 1819. It is a variant of the Newton–Raphson method made more efficient for hand calculation by the application of Horner's rule. It was widely used until computers came into general use around 1970.

Polynomial evaluation and long division 

Given the polynomial

where  are constant coefficients, the problem is to evaluate the polynomial at a specific value  of 

For this, a new sequence of constants is defined recursively as follows:

To see why this works, the polynomial can be written in the form

Thus, by iteratively substituting the  into the expression,
 

Now, it can be proven that;

This expression constitutes Horner's practical application, as it offers a very quick way of determining the outcome of;

Then you then work recursively using the formula;

Examples 

We use synthetic division as follows:

  │               
  3 │   2    −6     2    −1
    │         6     0     6
    └────────────────────────
        2     0     2     5

The entries in the third row are the sum of those in the first two. Each entry in the second row is the product of the -value (3 in this example) with the third-row entry immediately to the left. The entries in the first row are the coefficients of the polynomial to be evaluated.

Thus 

In this example, if  we can see that , the entries in the third row. So, synthetic division is based on Horner's method.

This makes Horner's method useful for polynomial long division.

Divide  by :

  2 │   1    −6    11    −6
    │         2    −8     6
    └────────────────────────
        1    −4     3     0

Divide  by  using Horner's method.

 
 
   0.5 │ 4  -6   0   3  -5
       │     2  -2  -1   1
       └───────────────────────
         2  -2  -1   1  -4

The answer is

Efficiency 

Evaluation using the monomial form of a degree  polynomial requires at most  additions and  multiplications, if powers are calculated by repeated multiplication and each monomial is evaluated individually.

If numerical data are represented in terms of digits (or bits), then the naive algorithm also entails storing approximately  times the number of bits of : the evaluated polynomial has approximate magnitude , and one must also store  itself. Alternatively, Horner's method can be computed with  fused multiply–adds. Horner's method can also be extended to evaluate the first  derivatives of the polynomial with  additions and multiplications.

Horner's method is optimal, in the sense that any algorithm to evaluate an arbitrary polynomial must use at least as many operations. Alexander Ostrowski proved in 1954 that the number of additions required is minimal. Victor Pan proved in 1966 that the number of multiplications is minimal. However, when  is a matrix, Horner's method is not optimal.

This assumes that the polynomial is evaluated in monomial form and no preconditioning of the representation is allowed, which makes sense if the polynomial is evaluated only once. However, if preconditioning is allowed and the polynomial is to be evaluated many times, then faster algorithms are possible. They involve a transformation of the representation of the polynomial. In general, a degree- polynomial can be evaluated using only +2 multiplications and  additions.

Parallel evaluation

A disadvantage of Horner's rule is that all of the operations are sequentially dependent, so it is not possible to take advantage of instruction level parallelism on modern computers.  In most applications where the efficiency of polynomial evaluation matters, many low-order polynomials are evaluated simultaneously (for each pixel or polygon in computer graphics, or for each grid square in a numerical simulation), so it is not necessary to find parallelism within a single polynomial evaluation.

If, however, one is evaluating a single polynomial of very high order, it may be useful to break it up as follows:

More generally, the summation can be broken into k parts:

where the inner summations may be evaluated using separate parallel instances of Horner's method.  This requires slightly more operations than the basic Horner's method, but allows k-way SIMD execution of most of them. Modern compilers generally evaluate polynomials this way when advantageous, although for floating-point calculations this requires enabling (unsafe) reassociative math.

Application to floating-point multiplication and division

Horner's method is a fast, code-efficient method for multiplication and division of binary numbers on a microcontroller with no hardware multiplier. Then, x (or x to some power) is repeatedly factored out. In this binary numeral system (base 2), so powers of 2 are repeatedly factored out.

Example
For example, to find the product of two numbers (0.15625) and m:

Method
To find the product of two binary numbers d and m:
1. A register holding the intermediate result is initialized to d.
2. Begin with the least significant (rightmost) non-zero bit in m.
2b. Count (to the left) the number of bit positions to the next most significant non-zero bit.  If there are no more-significant bits, then take the value of the current bit position.
2c. Using that value, perform a left-shift operation by that number of bits on the register holding the intermediate result
3. If all the non-zero bits were counted, then the intermediate result register now holds the final result.  Otherwise, add d to the intermediate result, and continue in step 2 with the next most significant bit in m.

Derivation
In general, for a binary number with bit values the product is

At this stage in the algorithm, it is required that terms with zero-valued coefficients are dropped, so that only binary coefficients equal to one are counted, thus the problem of multiplication or division by zero is not an issue, despite this implication in the factored equation:

The denominators all equal one (or the term is absent), so this reduces to

or equivalently (as consistent with the "method" described above)

In binary (base-2) math, multiplication by a power of 2 is merely a register shift operation.  Thus, multiplying by 2 is calculated in base-2 by an arithmetic shift.  The factor (2−1) is a right arithmetic shift, a (0) results in no operation (since 20 = 1 is the multiplicative identity element), and a (21) results in a left arithmetic shift.
The multiplication product can now be quickly calculated using only arithmetic shift operations, addition and subtraction.

The method is particularly fast on processors supporting a single-instruction shift-and-addition-accumulate.  Compared to a C floating-point library, Horner's method sacrifices some accuracy, however it is nominally 13 times faster (16 times faster when the "canonical signed digit" (CSD) form is used) and uses only 20% of the code space.

Other applications 

Horner's method can be used to convert between different positional numeral systems – in which case x is the base of the number system, and the ai coefficients are the digits of the base-x representation of a given number – and can also be used if x is a matrix, in which case the gain in computational efficiency is even greater. However, for such cases faster methods are known.

Polynomial root finding 
Using the long division algorithm in combination with Newton's method, it is possible to approximate the real roots of a polynomial. The algorithm works as follows. Given a polynomial  of degree  with zeros  make some initial guess  such that . Now iterate the following two steps:

 Using Newton's method, find the largest zero  of  using the guess .
 Using Horner's method, divide out  to obtain . Return to step 1 but use the polynomial  and the initial guess .

These two steps are repeated until all real zeros are found for the polynomial. If the approximated zeros are not precise enough, the obtained values can be used as initial guesses for Newton's method but using the full polynomial rather than the reduced polynomials.

Example 

Consider the polynomial

 

which can be expanded to

 

From the above we know that the largest root of this polynomial is 7 so we are able to make an initial guess of 8. Using Newton's method the first zero of 7 is found as shown in black in the figure to the right.

 

which is drawn in red in the figure to the right. Newton's method is used to find the largest zero of this polynomial with an initial guess of 7. The largest zero of this polynomial which corresponds to the second largest zero of the original polynomial is found at 3 and is circled in red.

 

which is shown in yellow. The zero for this polynomial is found at 2 again using Newton's method and is circled in yellow. Horner's method is now used to obtain

 

which is shown in green and found to have a zero at −3. This polynomial is further reduced to

 

which is shown in blue and yields a zero of −5. The final root of the original polynomial may be found by either using the final zero as an initial guess for Newton's method, or by reducing  and solving the linear equation. As can be seen, the expected roots of −8, −5, −3, 2, 3, and 7 were found.

Divided difference of a polynomial 

Horner's method can be modified to compute the divided difference  Given the polynomial (as before)

proceed as follows

At completion, we have

This computation of the divided difference is subject to less
round-off error than evaluating  and  separately, particularly when
.  Substituting

History 

Horner's paper, titled "A new method of solving numerical equations of all orders, by continuous approximation", was read  before the Royal Society of London, at its meeting on July 1, 1819, with a sequel in 1823. Horner's paper in Part II of Philosophical Transactions of the Royal Society of London for 1819 was warmly and expansively welcomed by a reviewer in the issue of The Monthly Review: or, Literary Journal for April, 1820; in comparison, a technical paper by Charles Babbage is dismissed curtly in this review. The sequence of reviews in The Monthly Review for September, 1821, concludes that Holdred was the first person to discover a direct and general practical solution of numerical equations. Fuller showed that the method in Horner's 1819 paper differs from what afterwards became known as "Horner's method" and that in consequence the priority for this method should go to Holdred (1820).

Unlike his English contemporaries, Horner drew on the Continental literature, notably the work of Arbogast. Horner is also known to have made a close reading of John Bonneycastle's book on algebra, though he neglected the work of Paolo Ruffini.

Although Horner is credited with making the method accessible and practical, it was known long before Horner. In reverse chronological order, Horner's method was already known to:

 Paolo Ruffini in 1809 (see Ruffini's rule)
 Isaac Newton in 1669
 the Chinese mathematician Zhu Shijie in the 14th century
 the Chinese mathematician Qin Jiushao in his Mathematical Treatise in Nine Sections in the 13th century
 the Persian mathematician Sharaf al-Dīn al-Ṭūsī in the 12th century (the first to use that method in a general case of cubic equation)
 the Chinese mathematician Jia Xian in the 11th century (Song dynasty)
 The Nine Chapters on the Mathematical Art, a Chinese work of the Han dynasty (202 BC – 220 AD) edited by Liu Hui (fl. 3rd century).

Qin Jiushao, in his Shu Shu Jiu Zhang (Mathematical Treatise in Nine Sections; 1247), presents a portfolio of methods of Horner-type for solving polynomial equations, which was based on earlier works of the 11th century Song dynasty mathematician Jia Xian; for example, one method is specifically suited to bi-quintics, of which Qin gives an instance, in keeping with the then Chinese custom of case studies. Yoshio Mikami in Development of Mathematics in China and Japan (Leipzig 1913) wrote:
Ulrich Libbrecht concluded: It is obvious that this procedure is a Chinese invention ... the method was not known in India. He said, Fibonacci probably learned of it from Arabs, who perhaps borrowed from the Chinese. The extraction of square and cube roots along similar lines is already discussed by Liu Hui in connection with Problems IV.16 and 22 in Jiu Zhang Suan Shu, while Wang Xiaotong in the 7th century supposes his readers can solve cubics by an approximation method described in his book Jigu Suanjing.

See also 

Clenshaw algorithm to evaluate polynomials in Chebyshev form
De Boor's algorithm to evaluate splines in B-spline form
De Casteljau's algorithm to evaluate polynomials in Bézier form
Estrin's scheme to facilitate parallelization on modern computer architectures
Lill's method to approximate roots graphically
Ruffini's rule and synthetic division to divide a polynomial by a binomial of the form x − r

Notes

References 

 Read before the Southwestern Section of the American Mathematical Society on November 26, 1910.

 Holdred's method is in the supplement following page numbered 45 (which is the 52nd page of the pdf version).

 Directly available online via the link, but also reprinted with appraisal in D.E. Smith: A Source Book in Mathematics, McGraw-Hill, 1929; Dover reprint, 2 vols, 1959.

 

 
 
 Reprinted from issues of The North China Herald (1852).

External links 

 
 Qiu Jin-Shao, Shu Shu Jiu Zhang (Cong Shu Ji Cheng ed.)
 For more on the root-finding application see 

Algebra
Polynomials
Numerical analysis